Eleanor Emlen Myers (1925December 1996) was an American archaeologist.

Myers had a twenty-year career as an educator, punctuated by overseas work with the American Friends Service Committee and a period with the Michigan Department of Social Services. She became interested in archaeology in the 1970s and began collaborating with her husband, J. Wilson Myers. Photography was Myers's specialty in the field. Over the course of a two-decade career, she produced a series of exhibits, co-authored a number of papers, and co-produced The Aerial Atlas of Ancient Crete (1992).

References

External links 
 J. Wilson Myers: Eleanor Emlen Myers, 1925-1996 Brown University
 Balloon Archaeology / William M. Seaman, J.E. Colcord, J. Wilson Myers and Eleanor Emlen Myers  jstor.org

1925 births
1996 deaths
American women archaeologists
20th-century American archaeologists
20th-century American women